Daraj Media is a pan-Arab news platform which launched on 1 November 2017. Daraj was founded by Alia Ibrahim, Hazem al Amin, and Diana Moukalled. Its tagline, "The third story", is a response to their criticism of Arabic media for lacking impartiality.

ICIJ collaborations 
The company was among the ICIJ's 95 media partners investigating the Paradise Papers, and Daraj's series on the papers were among its first published articles. Daraj Media was also among the outlets which worked with the ICIJ to publish the Pandora Papers.

References

External links 
  
 English section of Daraj News

2017 establishments in Lebanon
News media in Lebanon
Pan-Arabist media
Publications established in 2017
Paradise Papers
Pandora Papers
News websites
Lebanese news websites
Arabic-language websites